Geumjeong can refer to the following locations in South Korea:

Busan

Geumjeong-gu, a district in Busan
Geumjeong Fortress, a fortress in Busan
Geumjeongsan, a mountain in Busan

Gyeonggi Province

Geumjeong-dong, a ward in Gunpo City, Gyeonggi Province
Geumjeong Station, a Seoul Subway station in Gunpo City